Minocqua is a census-designated place located in the town of Minocqua, Oneida County, Wisconsin, United States. The community is served by U.S. Route 51. Minocqua has a post office with ZIP code 54548. As of the 2010 census, its population is 451.

Images

References

External links

Census-designated places in Oneida County, Wisconsin
Census-designated places in Wisconsin